Edward Page (9 March 1889 – 12 December 1939) was a South African cricket umpire. He stood in one Test match, South Africa vs. England, in 1928.

See also
 List of Test cricket umpires

References

1889 births
1939 deaths
People from Port Elizabeth
South African Test cricket umpires